The 2018 Judo Grand Slam Düsseldorf was held in Düsseldorf, Germany, from 23 to 25 February 2018.

Medal summary

Men's events

Women's events

Source Results

Medal table

References

External links
 

2018 IJF World Tour
2018 Judo Grand Slam
Judo